The Répertoire du goût moderne is a five-volume set of folios depicting domestic interior design, created in 1928-29 and illustrated with the print technique pochoir by many famous designers and architects including Charlotte Perriand, Robert Mallet-Stevens, Gabriel Guevrekian, Francis Jourdain, Etienne Kohlmann, and Djo-Bourgeois. The pochoir plates were printed by the firm owned by Jean Saudé. Images from the folios may be found in the resource Artstor.

Publisher

The imprint of the Répertoire du goût moderne reads: Editions Albert Lévy, Librairie de Central Beaux-Arts, 2, Rue de l'Échelle, Paris. Levy was the second in a line of publishers who had maintained the imprint Librairie Centrale des Beaux-Arts on topics around design, such as architecture and fashion.

Bibliography

References

1928 non-fiction books
1929 non-fiction books
Interior design
Design books
French non-fiction books